Senator Niblack may refer to:

Silas L. Niblack (1825–1883), Florida State Senate
William E. Niblack (1822–1893), Indiana State Senate